Ulrich Schindel (September 10, 1935 in Frankfurt am Main) is a German classical philologist.

He earned his doctorate from the University of Göttingen in 1961, his thesis being Demosthenes in the 18th century (Demosthenes im 18. Jahrhundert). In 1971, Schindel received his habilitation. From 1974 to 1976 he was associate professor until he succeeded Will Richter as Full Professor of Classics. He taught Latin and Greek literature until his retirement as professor emeritus in 2003.

His main field of study is the history and transmission of ancient grammatic and rhetoric literature. Also, Schindel is interested in reception history and the history of classical scholarship.

References 
University of Göttingen (published works & biography)

German classical philologists
Academic staff of the University of Göttingen
1935 births
Writers from Frankfurt
Living people
People from Hesse-Nassau